The Quilt Index is a searchable database for scholars, quilters and educators featuring over 50,000 quilts from documentation projects, museums, libraries, and private collections.  It also has quilt-related ephemera and curated essays and lesson plans for teachers.

Searching
The overall collection includes quilts made from the early nineteenth century to the twenty-first century, representing a wide range of quilting styles, techniques, purposes and functions.

Users can browse for quilts based on their time period, location of origin, style, purpose, or by the collection in which they are now housed, or search for specific quilts by a variety of metadata, including pattern, quilter and identification number.

List of contributing partners
The American Folk Art Museum
 American Quilt Study Group
 Connecticut Quilt Search Project
 The Daughters of the American Revolution Museum
 Hawaiian Quilt Research Project
 Illinois Quilt Research Project quilts owned by Illinois State Museum
 State Historical Society of Iowa
 The Kentucky Quilt Project at University of Louisville Archives and Records Center 
 The Library of Congress American Folklife Center
 The Louisiana Regional Folklife Program
 The Mary Gasperik Quilts
 MassQuilts: The Massachusetts Quilt Documentation Project
 The Merikay Waldvogel Private Collection
 Michigan Quilt Project and Michigan State University Quilt Collection at Michigan State University Museum and Great Lakes Quilt Center 
 Minnesota Quilt Project
 The Mountain Heritage Center
 The Museum of the American Quilter's Society 
 New England Quilt Museum Collection
 The Heritage Quilt Project of New Jersey at Rutgers University Libraries and Special Collections
 North Carolina Museum of History
 The International Quilt Study Center and the Nebraska Quilt Project at the University of Nebraska-Lincoln 
 Quilts of Tennessee at Tennessee State Library and Archives 
 Rhode Island Quilt Documentation Project at the University of Rhode Island
 Rocky Mountain Quilt Museum
 The Signature Quilt Project
 Texas Quilt Search and the Winedale Quilt Collection at the Center for American History, University of Texas at Austin
 West Virginia Heritage Quilt Search
 The Wilene Smith Private Collection
 Wyoming Quilt Project, Inc.

Collections, essays and exhibits 
Although the Quilt Index is not an actual museum site with in-house collections, the Index does have online exhibitions which highlight works in its digital collection.  These include: 
 Since Kentucky: Surveying State Quilts
 Mary Schafer: Quilter, Quilt Collector, and Quilt Historian
 Redwork: An American Textile Tradition
 Mary Gasperik (1888-1969): Her Life And Her Quilts
 Researching Signature Quilts

Wiki
The Quilt Index Wiki which became live in August 2008, is a collaborative, user-generated tool for quilters and quilt scholars featuring information about state and provincial quilt documentation projects, including publication lists and locations where records are housed.  The wiki also provides an expanding directory of museums with quilt collections, and information about those collections.  Users can also add information about local, regional and national oral history projects relating to quilt history to the wiki.  The wiki is powered by MediaWiki software.  Although not fully WYSIWYG, instructions for editing the wiki are available on its main page.

Conference presentations 
 Justine Richardson, Dean Rehberger, Marsha MacDowell, Amanda Sikarskie, Mary Worrall, "The Quilt Index Goes 2.0: A Fiberspace Case Study," Presented: April 16, 2009, at Museums and the Web 2009.
 Marsha MacDowell and Mary Worrall, "The Quilt Index: Documenting and Accessing an American Art," poster session, College Art Association, Los Angeles, accepted for presentation in February 2009.
 Mark Kornbluh, The Quilt Index: Online Tools and Ephemera Expansion, Let's Do I.t. RIght! Museum Computer Network 36th Annual Conference Program, Washington, D.C., November 14, 2008.
 Marsha MacDowell, "The Quilt Index and Quilt Treasures: New Tools for American Art and Art History Research and Education," Department of Art and Art History Faculty Lecture Series, November 11, 2008.
 Mary Worrall. "Documenting Quilting Traditions: Sharing Stories and Stitches." Michigan Oral History Association. Rogers City, Michigan, November 2008.
 Marsha MacDowell, "The Quilt Index: A Tool for Preservation, Collection Management, Education, and Research," Cooperstown Graduate Association, Cooperstown, NY, Oct. 4, 2008.
 Mary Worrall, Marsha MacDowell and Justine Richardson. "The Quilt Index: Communicating Stories in the Stitches." Textile Society of America Biennial Symposium. Honolulu, Hawaii, September 2008.
 Mary Worrall, “Textiles and Technology: The Quilt Index as a National Model for Online Thematic Collections,” Michigan Museums Association, Flint, MI, 2006.
 Mary Worrall, “Piecing History: Quilt Documentation and the Quilt Index,” Florida Museum of Natural History, Gainesville, FL, 2006.
 Marsha MacDowell, Mary Worrall, Patricia Crews, Jennifer Gilbert, Justine Richardson, “Stitching Data: The Quilt Index as a National Model for Online Thematic Collections Session,” American Association of Museums Annual Meeting and Expo, Boston, MA, April 29, 2006.

Publications

Facilitators
The Alliance for American Quilts (AAQ), MATRIX: Center for Humane Arts, Letters and Social Sciences Online and Michigan State University Museum present the Quilt Index. Michigan State University staff members lead project work, in consultation with AAQ, the Quilt Index Task Force, the Quilt Index Editorial Board, and representatives from each contributor.

The project has been supported by major grants from the National Endowment for the Humanities and the Institute for Museum and Library Services.

Copyright issues
Contributors to the Quilt Index retain copyright to their contributions of data (both text and images), and agree to permanently license these contributions to the Quilt Index to display on the website for educational purposes.

External links
 

Quilting
Databases in the United States